Biri, officially the Municipality of Biri, is a 5th class municipality in the province of Northern Samar, Philippines. According to the 2020 census, it has a population of 11,274 people.

The archipelagic town is also known for its inakob, a traditional Waray dish made by first cooking grated root crops (gabi) with coconut milk, condensed milk, eggs, brown sugar, and an herb called anuv. Once cooked, the grated gabi is put inside gabi shells which have been peeled. The dish is then boiled with coconut milk. The dish is traditionally eaten hot by the people of Biri during the rainy months.

Geography
The municipality is facing Pacific Ocean to the east and San Bernardino Strait to the west. It consists of several islands off the northern coast of Samar Island, the largest of which is Biri Island. Other larger islands are Talisay, Magasang, and Cagnipa. Biri Island is notable for a large number of unusual rock formations along the northern shore, facing the Philippine Sea. It is included in the marine protected area known as Biri Larosa Protected Landscape and Seascape.

Barangays

Biri is politically subdivided into 8 barangays.
Poblacion (Biri)
MacArthur
Kauswagan (Basud)
Pio Del Pilar
Progress or Talisay
San Antonio
San Pedro
Santo Niño (Palhugan)

Climate

Demographics

Economy

Mangrove reforestation

In 2007, the Community-Based Mangrove Protection and Management project was implemented in Biri, funded by the Philippine Tropical Forest Conservation Foundation (PTFCF). The project aimed to contribute to the regeneration of the mangrove ecosystem by establishing a community-based mangrove management system. The project covered protection of 546 hectares and enhancement planting in 39 hectares. As of 2013, it has been expanded to all eight barangays in Biri.

Biri Initiative Org.

In 2012, a non-profit organization, Biri Initiative Org., was registered with the Philippine Securities and Exchange Commission. Its main objectives are to restore areas of coral reef damaged by illegal fishing methods, promote sustainable and environment-friendly methods of fishing, and encourage opportunities for alternative livelihoods, particularly for women.

References

External links

 [ Philippine Standard Geographic Code]
 Philippine Census Information
 Local Governance Performance Management System

Municipalities of Northern Samar
Island municipalities in the Philippines